Philip Cunningham is a chiptune and electropop producer based in Glasgow, Scotland. He is part of the new wave of chiptune musicians who were born after the rise of the demoscene.  He has releases on several online netlabels, including: CrunchyCo, Toilville, 8bitpeoples, mp3death, Pale Fox Records, Intikrec and PixelPOP! Records.

Discography

LPs
popNaive (2008)

EPs and Singles
Game Boy Princess (2004) Toilville
An Unknown Army (2005) mp3death
Chipz! (2006) CrunchyCo
Orange (2006) Pale Fox Records
Songs for Cake (2008) 8bitpeoples
Oh Deer (2008) PixelPOP! Records
The Split (2008) CrunchyCo
Glasgow (2010) Self-released

Compilations
"Famous" on Lowbitfever (2008) Intikrec
"Forest Dub" on Ultrachip VS Forest Closure (2010)

External links 
Firebrand Boy on Discogs
Firebrand Boy on Facebook
Firebrand Boy on MySpace
Firebrand Boy on Twitter
Firebrand Boy on Last.fm

References

Living people
1986 births
Chiptune musicians
8bitpeoples artists